Strata is the plural of stratum (the geological formation); for uses in the singular, see Stratum (disambiguation).

Strata may also refer to:

Media

Music
 Strata (band), a Northern California band
 Strata (Matthew Shipp album), 1998 
 Strata (Robert Rich and Steve Roach album), 1990
 Strata (Strata album), 2004
 Strata Records, a record label
 Strata-East Records, a record label

Printed media
 Strata (comics), a superhero in the DC Universe
 Strata (novel), a science fiction novel by Terry Pratchett

Software
 Kirix Strata, a web browser
 Strata (company), a software company
 Strata 3D, a 3D software
 Strata (video game), a 2013 puzzle game
 Strata, an IT certification from CompTIA

Other uses
 Strata (food), a family of layered casseroles
 Strata (linguistics)
 Strata roller coaster, a height classification, of roller coaster
 Strata SE1, a building in London, England
 Strata title, a form of ownership devised for multi-level apartment blocks
 Strata Tower, building in Abu Dhabi
 Strata, a homogeneous subgroups of members in Stratified sampling population

See also
 Stratum (disambiguation)
 Substrata (disambiguation)